Peter Mathews (August 1951 – 27 February 2017) was an Irish economist and politician who served as a Teachta Dála (TD) for the Dublin South constituency from 2011 to 2016.

Initially elected as a Fine Gael TD for the Dublin South constituency at the 2011 general election, he lost that party's parliamentary party whip in July 2013. He left the Fine Gael party in October 2013 and sat as an Independent TD for the remainder of the 31st Dáil.

A frequent panelist on Tonight with Vincent Browne during the Irish financial crisis, Mathews attended Gonzaga College and went on to study Commerce at University College Dublin. He was married to Susan and they had four children. Mathews joined the Progressive Democrats on its foundation but left shortly afterwards.

He was a qualified Chartered Accountant, and worked for Coopers & Lybrand (now PwC) and ICC Bank. Before entering politics, he was a consultant on banking and finance, and a media commentator.

On 14 March 2012, the Government was defeated in a vote taken at a meeting of the Oireachtas finance committee after numerous Fine Gael TDs went missing. The motion, tabled by Mathews who was then forced to vote against it following threats from his colleagues, proposed that Central Bank Governor Patrick Honohan be forced to appear before the Oireachtas finance committee by the end of the month.

Mathews was expelled from the Fine Gael Parliamentary Party on 2 July 2013, when he defied the party whip by voting against the Protection of Life During Pregnancy Bill 2013. On 13 September 2013, he and six other expellees formed the Reform Alliance, described as a "loose alliance" rather than a political party.

On 3 October 2013, he resigned from Fine Gael.

Despite a diagnosis of oesophageal cancer, Mathews said he would still contest the 2016 general election. However, he lost his seat. Mathews died as a result of his cancer on 27 February 2017, aged 65.

References

 

1951 births
2017 deaths
Alumni of University College Dublin
Fine Gael TDs
Independent TDs
Irish broadcast news analysts
Members of the 31st Dáil
People educated at Gonzaga College
Politicians from Dublin (city)